The 2014 Windward Islands Tournament is an international football tournament between the Windward Islands nations which will be hosted by Dominica between 30 April and 4 May 2014. 

Players marked (c) were named as captain for their national squad.

Dominica
Coach:  Ronnie Gustave

Source:

Grenada
Coach:  Clarke John 

Source:

Saint Lucia

Coach:  Francis Lastic

Source:

Saint Vincent and the Grenadines
Coach:  Cornelius Huggins

Source:

References

Windward Islands Tournament squads